Montmort is a commune in the Saône-et-Loire department in the region of Bourgogne-Franche-Comté in eastern France. It has a Romanesque church from the 11th century.

See also
Communes of the Saône-et-Loire department
Pierre Raymond de Montmort, a French mathematician

References

Roman church from the 11th century

Communes of Saône-et-Loire